Tilos a Bemenet (No Entry) was the first operetta by Jenő Huszka. It premiered 2 September 1899 at the Magyar theatre in Budapest, Hungary but was not a success, mainly due to the poor libretto (written by Adolf Mérei).

Sources

Hungarian-language operettas
1899 operas
Operas by Jenő Huszka